Callitos Fernando Lopez (born 10 December 1980) is a former Barbadian cricketer who played for Barbadian national side and several other teams in West Indian domestic cricket. He played as a right-arm pace bowler.

Lopez was born in Saint Peter Parish, Barbados. He represented the West Indies under-19s in six matches in the 2000 Under-19 World Cup in Sri Lanka, and took five wickets with a best of 3/16 against Zimbabwe. After the World Cup, Lopez made his first-class debut in August 2000, playing for Barbados against a touring South Africa A team. Opening the bowling with future West Indies international Ian Bradshaw, he took 5/61 in the second innings of the match, which was to be the best performance of his career. Later in 2000, Lopez played two limited-overs matches for Barbados in the 2000–01 Red Stripe Bowl. He did not return to first-class cricket until the 2001–02 Busta Cup, when he appeared in five matches for West Indies B (a development team). He had little success, however, taking only five wickets. In November 2008, after over six years out of top-flight West Indian domestic cricket, Lopez was selected in the Combined Campuses and Colleges squad for the 2008–09 WICB Cup. He took three wickets in four matches, with a best of 2/66 against Trinidad and Tobago.

References

External links
Player profile and statistics at CricketArchive
Player profile and statistics at ESPNcricinfo

1980 births
Living people
Barbadian cricketers
Barbados cricketers
Combined Campuses and Colleges cricketers
People from Saint Peter, Barbados
West Indies B cricketers